Connecticut's 3rd State Senate district elects one member to the Connecticut State Senate. It consists of the towns of East Hartford, East Windsor, South Windsor, and part of Ellington. It is currently represented by Democrat Saud Anwar, who has served since 2019.

Recent elections

2020

2018

2016

2014

2012

References

03